Chilley Stream is a minor,  long stream (brook) of the Pevensey Levels in Hailsham, in the Wealden District of East Sussex, England. It is a tributary of Pevensey Haven. Rising from Burgh Fleet and Monkham Sewer, Chilley Stream acts as a drainage ditch for several minor streams—including the distributary Manxey Sewer—although many of which are unnamed.

Water quality 
Water quality assessments of the river in 2016 undertaken by the Environment Agency, a non-departmental public body sponsored by the United Kingdom's Department for Environment, Food and Rural Affairs:

References 

Rivers of East Sussex
Rivers of the Pevensey Levels